Pedioplanis namaquensis, known commonly as the Namaqua sand lizard or l'Érémias namaquois (in French), is a species of lizard in the family Lacertidae. The species is endemic to Southern Africa.

Geographic range
P. namaquensis is found in Botswana, Namibia, and South Africa.

Description
The lower eyelid has 10–12 enlarged scales, and is semitransparent.

Diet
P. namaquensis preys upon insects.

Reproduction
P. namaquensis is oviparous.

References

Further reading
Auerbach RD (1987). The Amphibians and Reptiles of Botswana. Gaborone, Botswana: Mokwepa Consultants. 295 pp. .
Boulenger GA (1887). Catalogue of the Lizards in the British Museum (Natural History). Second Edition. Volume III. Lacertidæ ... London: Trustees of the British Museum (Natural History). (Taylor and Francis, printers). xii + 575 pp. + Plates I-XL. (Eremias namaquensis, pp. 91–92).
Duméril AMC, Bibron G (1839). Erpétologie générale ou Histoire naturelle complète des Reptiles. Tome cinquième [Volume 5]. Paris: Roret. viii + 854 pp. (Eremias namaquensis, new species, pp. 307–309). (in French).

Pedioplanis
Lacertid lizards of Africa
Reptiles of Botswana
Reptiles of Namibia
Reptiles of South Africa
Reptiles described in 1839
Taxa named by André Marie Constant Duméril
Taxa named by Gabriel Bibron